The aminopenicillins are a group of antibiotics in the penicillin family that are structural analogs of ampicillin (which is the 2-amino derivative of benzylpenicillin, hence the name). Like other penicillins and beta-lactam antibiotics, they contain a beta-lactam ring that is crucial to its antibacterial activity.

Aminopenicillins feature a positively charged amino group that enhances their uptake through bacterial porin channels. This does not, however, prevent resistance conferred by bacterial beta-lactamases.  Members of this family include ampicillin, amoxicillin and bacampicillin.

See also
 Penicillin
 Extended-spectrum penicillin
 Carboxypenicillin

References

Penicillins